The Princeton Tigers represent Princeton University in ECAC women's ice hockey during the 2017–18 NCAA Division I women's ice hockey season.

In the immediate aftermath of the successful 2016-17 campaign, Kelsey Koelzer signed a late season contract with the New York Riveters of the NWHL.  Koelzer, who has since graduated, signed in time to bolster the Riveter's playoff roster.  Following a bid to make the US National Team for the 2018 Olympics, Koelzer re-signed with New York (renamed the Metropolitan Riveters), for 2017–18.

In June, a sharp blow was dealt, when 21-year coach Jeff Kampersall announced his departure to coach the Penn State Nittany Lions.  Kampersall ranks 11th all-time in wins for NCAA women's hockey coaches. Less than two weeks later, Assistant coach Cara Morey was named Head Coach.

Recruiting

2017–18 Tigers

Standings

Schedule

|-
!colspan=12 style="  style="background:black;color:#F77F00;"| Regular Season

Awards and honors
 Carly Bullock, 2017-18 First Team All-Ivy
 Karlie Lund, 2017-18 Second Team All-Ivy
 Claire Thompson, 2017-18 Second Team All-Ivy
 Stephanie Sucharda, 2017-18 Second Team All-Ivy
 Stephanie Neatby, 2017-18 Second Team All-Ivy

References

Princeton
Princeton Tigers women's ice hockey seasons
Princeton Tigers
Princeton Tigerss